A field post office (FPO) is a post office set up during time of war or when a military unit is on manoeuvres. It is a place to which mail intended for military units in the field is sent to be sorted and forwarded. It is set up "in the field", hence the name, however, FPOs may be on land or at sea. Their use pre-dates the introduction of postage stamps.

History 
The first British FPO was in 1808 during the Peninsular War and in 1840 the British Army used a FPO during the first Chinese War.

FPOs were also used extensively during the Crimean War.

Military post offices abroad strive to provide the same services found in their home country. Facilities are often cramped because of the amount of mail they need to handle. Today, military personnel who handle mail must be authorized and trained to do so in accordance with Postal Service and Department of Defense regulations (US). Working in a war zone and screening for hazardous contents in parcels can be dangerous, but the work does help with positive effect the mail has on morale as well as providing a vital service for the military.

Terminology 
In the United States a close equivalent is the Army Post Offices (APOs), the Air Force Post Offices (AFPOs) and the Fleet Post Offices (FPOs).

In Hungary the head FPO is known as the tábori főpostahivatal while a normal FPO is an tábori postahivatal.

Equivalent terms are in use in most countries with Field Post Offices.

Collecting 

Field Post Offices have special cancellations and their mail is eagerly collected by philatelists, but the cancellations are sometimes anonymised so that the place of posting is not revealed which presents collectors with a challenge.

References

Further reading 
Crouch, G. and Hill, N. British Army Field Post Offices 1939-1950: Locations and Assignments, 1951.
King, Christopher. "The Prussian Field Post-Relais in Denmark 1864: Mail in Denmark Handled by the Static Prussian Field Post Offices" in The Posthorn, Scandinavia Collectors Club, November 2007. Download link
Lowe, Robson. Indian Field Post Offices 1903-04, The Aden-Yemeni Boundary Commission, The Somaliland Field Force, Robson Lowe, 1979. .
Wagner, Ryszard. History of the Polish Army Postal Service, Middle East and Italy 1940-1948, Caldra House Limited, 1992.

External links 
British Forces Post Office
Field Post Cancellations from Czechoslovakia 1938
Field Post Offices in the Sudetenland 1938-45
Polish Field Post Offices during WW2 - Poczta Polowa

Philatelic terminology
Military mail

pl:Poczta polowa